Hicksville High School may refer to:

 Hicksville High School (New York) in Hicksville, New York
 Hicksville High School (Ohio) in Hicksville, Ohio